Tema Shipyard is a sea vessel construction company located in the port city of Tema in Ghana.

References

Shipyards of Africa